Responsive web design (RWD) or responsive design is an approach to web design that aims to make web pages render well on a variety of devices and window or screen sizes from minimum to maximum display size to ensure usability and satisfaction.

A responsive design adapts the web-page layout to the viewing environment by using techniques such as fluid proportion-based grids, flexible images, and CSS3 media queries, an extension of the @media rule, in the following ways:

 The fluid grid concept calls for page element sizing to be in relative units like percentages, rather than absolute units like pixels or points.
 Flexible images are also sized in relative units, so as to prevent them from displaying outside their containing element.
 Media queries allow the page to use different CSS style rules based on characteristics of the device the site is being displayed on, e.g. width of the rendering surface (browser window width or physical display size).
Responsive layouts automatically adjust and adapt to any device screen size, whether it is a desktop, a laptop, a tablet, or a mobile phone.

Responsive web design became more important as users of mobile devices came to account for the majority of website visitors. In 2015, for instance, Google announced Mobilegeddon and started to boost the page ranking of mobile-friendly sites when searching from a mobile device.

Responsive web design is an example of user interface plasticity.

Related concepts

Mobile first, unobtrusive JavaScript, and progressive enhancement

Mobile-first design and progressive enhancement are related concepts that predate RWD. Browsers of basic mobile phones do not understand JavaScript or media queries, so a recommended practice was to create a basic web site and enhance it for smartphones and personal computers, rather than rely on graceful degradation to make a complex, image-heavy site work on mobile phones.

Challenges, and other approaches

Luke Wroblewski has summarized some of the RWD and mobile design challenges and created a catalog of multi-device layout patterns. He suggested that, compared with a simple HWD approach, device experience or RESS (responsive web design with server-side components) approaches can provide a user experience that is better optimized for mobile devices. Server-side CSS generator implementation of stylesheet languages like Sass can be part of such an approach. Google has recommended responsive design for smartphone websites over other approaches.

Although many publishers have implemented responsive designs, one challenge for RWD adoption was that some banner advertisements and videos were not fluid. However, search advertising and (banner) display advertising came to support specific device platform targeting and different advertisement size formats for desktop, smartphone, and basic mobile devices. Different landing page URLs have been used for different platforms, or Ajax has been used to display different advertisement variants on a page. CSS tables permitted hybrid fixed and fluid layouts.

There have been many ways of validating and testing RWD designs, ranging from mobile site validators and mobile emulators to simultaneous testing tools like Adobe Edge Inspect. The Chrome, Firefox and Safari browsers and developer tools have offered responsive design viewport resizing tools, as do third parties.

History

The W3C specification of HTML+ stated that websites have to be rendered according to the user preferences. The customization of web page layout was lacking however. Many web developers resorted to ordinary HTML tables as a way to customize the layout and bring some basic responsiveness to their websites at the same time.

First major site to feature a layout that adapts in a non-trivial manner to browser viewport width was Audi.com launched in late 2001,  created by a team at razorfish consisting of Jürgen Spangl and Jim Kalbach (information architecture), Ken Olling (design), and Jan Hoffmann (interface development). Limited browser capabilities meant that for Internet Explorer, the layout could adapt dynamically in the browser whereas, for Netscape, the page had to be reloaded from the server when resized.

Cameron Adams created a demonstration in 2004.  By 2008, a number of related terms such as "flexible", "liquid", "fluid", and "elastic" were being used to describe layouts. CSS3 media queries were almost ready for prime time in late 2008/early 2009. Ethan Marcotte coined the term responsive web design—and defined it to mean fluid grid / flexible images / media queries—in a May 2010 article in A List Apart. He described the theory and practice of responsive web design in his brief 2011 book titled Responsive Web Design. Responsive design was listed as #2 in Top Web Design Trends for 2012 by .net magazine after progressive enhancement at #1.

Mashable called 2013 the Year of Responsive Web Design.

See also

 Adaptive web design
 Bootstrap (front-end framework)
 CSS framework
 
 Foundation (framework)
 Tableless web design

References

 
Computer-related introductions in 2010
Human–computer interaction
Mobile web
Usability
User interfaces
Web design
2010s neologisms